A Mercury crosser is an asteroid whose orbit crosses that of Mercury. The Mercury crossers proper have aphelia outside Mercury's (0.4667 AU) and perihelia inside Mercury's (0.3075 AU), whereas those listed here as outer grazers have perihelia within Mercury's aphelion but not within its perihelion. All have semi-major axes larger than Mercury's, and hence there are no known inner grazers.

List 
Mercury crossers proper have aphelia outside Mercury's (0.4667 AU) and perihelia inside Mercury's (0.3075 AU). , 362 Mercury crossers were known. (Most values have been rounded to three decimals.)

Mercury grazers
All Mercury grazers have semi-major axes larger than Mercury's (0.3871 AU), and hence are outer grazers, i.e. have perihelia within Mercury's aphelion (0.4667 AU) but not within its perihelion (0.3075 AU). , there are 561 Mercury grazers known. (Values have been rounded to three decimals.)

See also
List of Venus-crossing minor planets
List of Earth-crossing minor planets
List of Mars-crossing minor planets
List of Jupiter-crossing minor planets
List of Saturn-crossing minor planets
List of Uranus-crossing minor planets
List of Neptune-crossing minor planets

References

External links 
 Very Close Approaches (<0.01 AU) of PHAs to Mercury 1900–2200
 Upcoming Close Approaches (<0.10 AU) of Near-Earth Objects to Mercury
 Planetary Close Encounters for the next 200 years

Minor planet groups and families
Lists of minor planets
 
Asteroids
Asteroids